Rashid Zaid Al Zlami Al-Otaibi() (1926 – 29 December 2014) was a Saudi Arabian poet.

Personal life
He was born in the 1930s in Hejaz Saudi Arabia and had spent many years of his life in Kuwait during his service for the army of Kuwait and had a Kuwaiti passport, he is the youngest of six brothers, he was living in Ta'if city that he had been a lover of and loyal to throughout his poetic career, Rashid has married twice and had six sons, two of whom are died, now along with five daughters.  He died on 29 December in Jeddah where the prayer was held upon his soul in Makka holy mosque where he was buried in Aloud cemetery.

Death
He died on 29 December 2014 in Jeddah.

References

1926 births
2014 deaths
20th-century Saudi Arabian poets